Noel John Obelin Carbutt (25 December 1895 – 31 October 1964) was a first-class cricketer who played for the Essex County Cricket Club and other teams of India representing the Europeans. Carbutt was a leg-break bowler, making a total of 36 wickets in his 15 first-class matches at an average of 38.50.

Carbutt died in Durban, Natal, South Africa on 31 October 1964 at the age of 68.

External links
Profile at ESPNcricinfo
Profile  at CricketArchive

1895 births
1964 deaths
English cricketers
Essex cricketers
Europeans cricketers
Northern India cricketers
Combined Services cricketers
British Army cricketers
Karachi cricketers
Indian Army cricketers